The N Line, also known as the North Metro Rail Line during construction, is a commuter rail line which is part of the commuter and light rail system owned by the Regional Transportation District (RTD) in the Denver metropolitan area in Colorado. The first  from downtown Denver to 124th Avenue in Thornton opened as part of the FasTracks expansion plan on September 21, 2020. The N Line features Colorado's longest bridge at  called the Skyway Bridge. While other RTD commuter lines are operated by Denver Transit Partners for RTD, this is the only line operated by RTD itself.

History 
The possibilities and studies for a rail line in the North Metropolitan Denver have existed since the opening of the Light Rail Central Corridor in 1994. In the 2004 election year voters approved the North Metro Corridor as part of the RTD FasTracks expansion plan. In September 2006 the Environmental Impact Statement (EIS) was started, with completion in late 2010, and gaining approval by the Federal Transit Administration in April 2011. A preexisting railroad right-of-way for the line was purchased in 2009. The contract to build the North Metro Rail line to 124th Avenue was awarded to Graham, Balfour Beatty, Hamon Constructors (GBBH) in November 2013 with notice to proceed in December 2013. The GBBH contract included an option that when funding is available RTD can exercise the option to build the line to 162nd Avenue.

Groundbreaking of the N Line's construction occurred on March 20, 2014 with an expected completion date in 2018. The GBBH joint Venture is operating under the name Regional Rail Partners (RRP). By August 2018, construction on the line was 85% complete, but the estimated completion had slipped to late 2020 or early 2021; the start of revenue service had again been delayed several months by September 2019. Despite slowdowns caused by the COVID-19 pandemic, the line opened on September 21, 2020.

Route 
The N Line's southern terminus is at Union Station in Denver. It runs mostly on a preexisting railroad right-of-way to its northern terminus at Eastlake/124th station. A notable exception to using the existing railroad right-of-way is the RTD designated "Skyway Bridge" whose path takes it over and past several obstacles: it crosses the BNSF Railway railroad tracks, Brighton Boulevard, a Union Pacific Railroad spur track, the Farmers Reservoir and Irrigation Company (FRICO) Ditch, the Metro Waste Water Plant and Suncor oil processing site, Sand Creek, and Interstate 270.

The N line route leaves Union Station following the Union Pacific / BNSF corridor, near Coors Field it crosses over the rail yards and twice the South Platte River continuing northeast into the 48th & Brighton/National Western Center station located near the National Western Stock Show complex. The northeasterly line near Riverside Cemetery then enters the Skyway Bridge to begin a northern path returning to grade level near the Commerce City/72nd station following again the former rail right of way into the station. From there it passes under Interstate 76 and Colorado State Highway 224, then again over the South Platte River following a slightly northwest path north until the Original Thornton/88th station. Then, on a slight northeast path, the line near 100th Avenue curves northwest into the Thornton Crossroads/104th station. On a northwest path the line continues until near East 112th Avenue where in travels north into the Northglenn/112th station. On a northward path the line arrives at Eastlake/124th station, the site of a historic grain elevator and Eastlake, Colorado.

Stations

FasTracks 

In 2004 Colorado voters approved FasTracks, a multibillion-dollar public transportation expansion plan. In 2009 RTD paid $117 million ($ adjusted for inflation) to purchase the right-of-way from Union Pacific in preparation for the build-out of the North Metro rail line. Budgeting issues set back FasTracks plans, including those for the N Line.  Construction of the line was able to proceed when RTD partnered with a private firm to build the line in 2 stages.  The first stage will build the line to the 124th Avenue Station with an opening in 2020, while the second stage to North Thornton/Hwy 7 station will commence when projected ridership makes economic sense.

References 

RTD commuter rail
Transportation in Adams County, Colorado
Railway services introduced in 2020
Railway lines opened in 2020